Antheraea godmani is a moth of the family Saturniidae first described by Herbert Druce in 1892. It is found from Mexico to Colombia.

References

Antheraea
Moths described in 1892
Moths of North America
Moths of South America